Baiomyini is a tribe of rodents in the subfamily Neotominae occurring from the southern United States to Panama. It includes the genera Baiomys and Scotinomys, with a total of four living species.

References

References
Musser, G.G. and Carleton, M.D. 2005. Superfamily Muroidea. Pp. 894–1531 in Wilson, D.E. and Reeder, D.M. (eds.). Mammal Species of the World: A Taxonomic and Geographic Reference. 3rd ed. Baltimore: The Johns Hopkins University Press, 2 vols., 2142 pp. 

Neotominae
Mammal tribes
Taxa named by Guy Musser
Taxa named by Michael D. Carleton